Nicolas Douchez (born 22 April 1980) is a French former professional footballer who played as a goalkeeper.

Club career

Toulouse
In 2005, Douchez signed for Toulouse FC. He played 86 league games for the club before signing with Rennes.

Rennes
Douchez signed for Rennes in 2008, where he spent over three years with the club playing over 100 league games.

Paris Saint-Germain
In 2011 Douchez signed for Paris Saint-Germain on a free transfer from Rennes. He was given the number 1 jersey for the upcoming season. Although he was initially expected to be the starter, this changed following the arrival of new club management, which recruited Salvatore Sirigu, who instead became the team's starting goalkeeper. Douchez played in the club's 2–1 victory over Lyon in the 2014 Coupe de la Ligue Final on 19 April 2014. After the arrival of Kevin Trapp, Douchez became third goalkeeper.

Lens
In July 2016, free agent Douchez signed a three-year contract with Ligue 2 side RC Lens.

Red Star
In July 2018, Douchez signed for Red Star, newly promoted to Ligue 2.

International career
On 1 October 2009, Douchez was called up to France manager Raymond Domenech's 23-man squad for 2010 FIFA World Cup qualifiers against Faroe Islands and Austria.

Career statistics

Honours
Rennes
 UEFA Intertoto Cup: 2008

Paris Saint-Germain
 Ligue 1: 2012–13, 2013–14
 Coupe de France: 2014–15
 Coupe de la Ligue: 2013–14, 2014–15
 Trophée des Champions: 2013, 2014

References

External links

Profile, Stats & Pics of Nicolas Douchez

1980 births
Living people
People from Rosny-sous-Bois
Footballers from Seine-Saint-Denis
Association football goalkeepers
French footballers
Le Havre AC players
LB Châteauroux players
Toulouse FC players
Stade Rennais F.C. players
Paris Saint-Germain F.C. players
RC Lens players
Red Star F.C. players
Ligue 1 players
Ligue 2 players
Mediterranean Games bronze medalists for France
Mediterranean Games medalists in football
Competitors at the 2001 Mediterranean Games